The Canadian Passenger Accelerated Service System (CANPASS) is a Canada Border Services Agency program in place to streamline customs and immigration clearance for travellers flying on corporate and private aircraft. The CANPASS Corporate Aircraft program and the CANPASS Private Aircraft program allow company and private aircraft that frequently fly directly into Canada from the United States to access more airports and provide expedited clearance. Enrolment in each program costs  for a validity period of five years.

Commercial airline passengers 
The CANPASS Air program for commercial airline passengers was introduced in July 2005 at Edmonton International Airport. The program was launched to "streamline the secure movement of trusted travellers into Canada." The program used iris recognition as proof of identity. The program was first launched in Edmonton, Calgary, Halifax, Montreal, Toronto, Vancouver, Winnipeg, and Ottawa.

In 2018, the CANPASS Air program for commercial airline passengers as well as the CANPASS Private Boats program for watercraft passengers were discontinued. Members were encouraged to join NEXUS, which has the same benefits of the former CANPASS programs in addition to the benefits of the United States' Global Entry program. Members maintained their privileges until their membership expired.

References

Canada–United States border
Customs services
Expedited border crossing schemes
Canadian transport law